Inside Series is a set of short television movies produced by Bloomberg Television that features in-depth profiles of successful companies and their leaders. The series began streaming on Netflix in 2014.

TV Movies
 Inside: Chipotle (2013) - profiles Chipotle Mexican Grill, an American restaurant chain
 Inside: De Beers (2012) - profiles De Beers diamond company
 Inside: Dolce & Gabbana (2013) - profiles Dolce & Gabbana, an Italian fashion company
 Inside: LinkedIn (2013) - profiles LinkedIn, a social networking service
 Inside Lego (2014) - officially titled Brick by Brick: Inside Lego, profiles The Lego Group, a Danish toy company
 Inside: McDonald's (2013) - profiles McDonald's, the world's largest chain of fast food hamburger restaurants 
 Inside: Pixar (2013) - profiles Pixar, an American computer animation film studio owned by the Walt Disney Company

References

External links
 

Bloomberg L.P.
2012 American television series debuts
2014 American television series endings
2010s American documentary television series